Pietro Adami was an Italian painter of coastal and marine views or vedute, active around the year 1730.

References

18th-century Italian painters
Italian male painters
Italian Baroque painters
Year of birth missing
Year of death missing
18th-century Italian people
18th-century Italian male artists